Powai Lake (Pronunciation: [pəʋəiː]) is an artificial lake, situated in Mumbai, in the Powai valley, where a Powai village with a cluster of huts existed. The city suburb called Powai shares its name with the lake.
Indian Institute of Technology Bombay, one of the premier institutions of science and technology in India, is located to the east of the lake. Another famous institution, the National Institute of Industrial Engineering (NITIE), is also located close to the lake. Housing complexes and plush hotels are developed all around the lake periphery. Population around the lake has thus substantially increased over the years.

The Powai Lake has gone through many stages of water quality degradation. The lake water which used to supply drinking water for Mumbai has been declared unfit to drink. The lake remains a tourist attraction.

History
Before the lake was built by the British, in 1799 AD, the estate where the lake is now was leased on a yearly rent to Dr. Scott. After his death in 1816, the government took control of the estate in 1826 and leased it to Framaji Kavasji, then the vice-president of the Agricultural and Horticultural Society of Western India after whom the lake was named when it was built in 1891.

A stream tributary of the Mithi river, which served the Powai village's water needs, was dammed in 1891, during the British period. It was initially to augment water supply to Bombay city (now called Mumbai), by constructing two dams of 10 m to store the rain water flowing from the lower slopes of the Western Ghats and streams from the eastern and northeastern slopes of hills. It was planned as an antiwater famine measure, to the southeast of Vihar Lake (a much larger lake) also for water supply to Mumbai city. The scheme was taken in hand in 1889. Though it was completed within a year at an initial cost of more than Rs. 6,50,000 and started providing two million gallons of water per day, it had to be abandoned due to the hue and cry against the quality of the water. Five lakhs of rupees more were spent on the scheme in 1919 in an attempt to restore the supply at least for the suburbs but this, too, was given up with the development of the Tansa works.

After the drinking water supply objective was abandoned in the early 1890s, in view of poor quality of the water due to pollution, water hyacinth and weeds, untreated sewage and large silt deposit, the lake was leased to the Western India Fishing Association, a quasi government organisation, who used it for fish culture and angling. Later, the Bombay Presidency Angling Association was formed in 1936. In 1955, under the Societies Registration Act 1860, it was registered as the Maharashtra State Angling Association (MSAA) and the lake is now under their control. Realising the gravity of the environmental pollution, the MSAA has revised its constitution "to actively care for, clean, develop, maintain, and beautify the Environment at Powai Lake."

MSAA is now involved with
 removal of water hyacinth infestation
 supporting research with Fisheries Department for conservation of the Indian mahaseer
 water quality analysis
 augmenting security.

Access
Kanjurmarg on the  Central Line (Mumbai Suburban Railway) of the  Mumbai Suburban Railway is the nearest railway station to the lake. The airport is also nearby.

Hydrology and water quality

The overflow from the lake flows into the Mithi River. Silt studies conducted in 1995 estimates in that 4500 lakh cubic metres of silt has been deposited in the lake since its construction. It supplied two million gallons of water to Bombay (now Mumbai) when it was built. Following the construction of the Tansa dam and creation of the reservoir, in 1892, Powai waters were used for irrigation. The lake drains a catchment of 6.61 km2 (part of the Powai-Kanheri hill ranges which also drain into the adjoining Vihar Lake and Tulsi Lake). The dam, built in stone masonry has a height varying from 3 m to 6m with top level of the dam kept at E.L. 58.5 m (with Town hall datum). Government of Maharashtra reports that due to eutrophication of the lake water from untreated sewage and garbage from nearby residential and slum colonies, the lake water is unfit for drinking water use. Hence, the lake is now used for recreation, gardening, cattle washing and fishing. The water of the lake is also supplied to Aarey colony and Larsen & Toubro for non domestic uses. Dissolved Oxygen (DO) level at the bottom of the lake is reported to be 0.71 mg/litre and at surface 4.11 mg/litre, average value of pH is 7.2 and COD is 42.70 mg/litre on the surface and 119 mg/litre at the bottom of the lake.

Lake rejuvenation
Appreciating the problem of silting, growth of water hyacinth, weed, and eutrophication of the lake, the IIT Bombay's Class of 1980 launched a "Revitalization of Powai Lake" with the objective of restoring the lake to its original pristine and sustainable form by adopting Eco-friendly designs and materials for the restoration works.

Some of the tasks proposed to be undertaken with the funds donated by IIT, Bombay included:

Removing water hyacinth and weeds from the lake in parts nearest to the campus
Starting a publicity and an awareness program in the area
Building embankments, walkways and pathways to the lake
Constructing a large gazebo for an evening (or morning or afternoon) by the lake
Planting trees, and creating a garden
Installing docks, deploying boats and canoes
Allocating funds for annual maintenance

The project was proposed to be professionally managed with a project manager working under directives of IIT Bombay with an "Oversight Committee" to monitor objectives set for the restoration work.

In 1995, the National Lake Conservation Plan (NLCP) of the Ministry of Environment and Forests (MoE&F), Government of India, reviewed the condition of Powai Lake and included the Lake in its list of ten major lakes in the country for revival and improvements. The restoration/revival programme, fully funded by the NLCP, was launched in April 2002, and implemented by Bombay Municipal Corporation (BMC) now called Brihanmumbai Municipal Corporation (BMC), the Government of Maharashtra and as a result the status of the lake has undergone a major shift from the hypertrophic condition to mesotrophic condition by adopting a novel technique of aeration and bioremediation. This has resulted in the lake being used for fishing and recreational purposes.

Desilting project

Brihanmumbai Municipal Corporation (BMC) has therefore plans to desilt the Powai Lake at a cost of US$9 million.

Fauna
Many crocodiles have been seen on the lake side.
White-throated kingfisher, small blue kingfisher, Indian spot-billed duck, spotted dove, a few purple swamphens, purple-rumped sunbirds, bronze-winged and pheasant-tailed jacanas, ashy prinias, brahminy kite, red-vented, red-whiskered and white-browed bulbuls, cormorants, lesser whistling ducks, grey, purple and Indian pond herons, little, intermediate egret and great egrets, peregrine falcon, greater coucal, rose-ringed and Alexandrine parakeets, Eurasian marsh harrier (possibly winter visitor), woolly-necked stork (winter visitor) hoopoe and whiskered terns.
butterflies, honey bees, bumble bees and beetles have also been sighted.

Flora
Balsam bushes, in their full bloom, in pink-purple color are seen around the lake periphery, like a carpet.

Powai Lake views

References

External links
Community Newspaper of Powai
Powai Lake Satellite image in Google Maps
Powai Temple
All Info on powai categorized

Lakes of Mumbai
Reservoirs in Maharashtra